Academy of Fine Arts in Warsaw is a public university of visual arts and applied arts located in the Polish capital. The Academy traces its history back to the Department of Arts founded at the Warsaw University in the Duchy of Warsaw in 1812. As a separate institution it was founded in 1844 in Congress Poland. In an upgrade in 1904 it was named the Warsaw School of Fine Arts; and in 1932 it received recognition as an Academy.  At first the institute did not have its own building and classes were held in several locations around the city.  Following an architectural competition a design by Alfons Gravier was chosen and construction began in 1911.  The building was completed by the outbreak of the First World War.

Faculties
Faculty of Painting
Faculty of Sculpture
Faculty of Graphic Arts
Faculty of Conservation and Restoration of Works of Art
Faculty of Interior Design
Faculty of Industrial Design
Faculty of Media Art

Notable students and faculty
Magdalena Abakanowicz (1930–2017)
Bronislaw Abramowicz (1837–1912)
Piotr Abraszewski (1932–1939)
Mirosław Bałka (1958)
Magda Bielesz (1977–)
Bogna Burska (1974)
Caziel (1906–1988)
Mikalojus Konstantinas Čiurlionis or Czurlanis in Polish (1875–1911)
Marian Czapla (1946–)
Wojciech Fangor (1922-2015)
Wojciech Gerson (1831–1901)
Chaim Goldberg (1917–2004)
Wiktoria Goryńska (1902–1945) 
Stanisław Horno-Popławski (1902-1997)
Krzysztof Jung (1951-1998)
Kali (1918–1998)
Julia Keilowa (1902-1943)
David van de Kop (1937–1994)
Katarzyna Kozyra (1963–)
Jeremi Kubicki (1911–1938) 
Bronisław Linke (1906-1962)
Lech Majewski (1947)
Witold Manastyrski (1915-1992)
Eugeniusz Geno Malkowski (1942–2016)
Karol Mondral (1880-1957)
Ryszard Sroczyński (1905–1966)
Boguslaw Szwacz (1912–1982)
Antoni Słonimski (1895–1976)
Wanda Telakowska (1905–1986)
Aleksander Żyw (1905–1995)
Henryk Tomaszewski (poster artist) (1914-2005)

References

External links 
 Homepage of the Academy of Fine Arts in Warsaw (English version)

 
Educational institutions established in 1844
Arts organizations established in the 1840s